The C. H. Wegner House is located in Wausau, Wisconsin.

History
Charles and Emma Wegner had this Colonial Revival home designed by Eschweiler and built 1922–24. Wegner ran a general store downtown. Still has breakfast nook and built-in cupboards and ice box.

It was listed on the National Register of Historic Places in 1980 and on the State Register of Historic Places in 1989.

References

Houses on the National Register of Historic Places in Wisconsin
National Register of Historic Places in Marathon County, Wisconsin
Houses in Marathon County, Wisconsin
Colonial Revival architecture in Wisconsin
Houses completed in 1924